Ghost Story is a horror novel by American writer Peter Straub. It was published on January 1, 1979, by Coward, McCann and Geoghegan, and adapted as a 1981 horror film, minus the fifth protagonist, Lewis Benedikt. It was a watershed in Straub's career, becoming a national bestseller and cementing his reputation.

Synopsis
The novel opens with a man named Donald Wanderley traveling with a young girl whom he has apparently kidnapped. Eventually, Donald and the girl arrive in Panama City, Florida, at which point the novel jumps back in time to the events of the previous winter.

Living in the small upstate New York town of Milburn (a fictional location which is indicated to be in Broome County east of Binghamton) are four elderly men who are members of a clique called the Chowder Society: John Jaffrey, a doctor; Lewis Benedikt, a retired entrepreneur; Sears James, an attorney; and Ricky Hawthorne, an attorney and James' partner. For the past 50 years these best friends have gathered together and told each other stories and have been great companions. However, their group once consisted of five members. One year earlier Jaffrey had thrown a party at his house in honor of a visiting actress named Ann-Veronica Moore, and their fifth member, Edward Wanderley, had died in an upstairs bedroom during the festivities. There was a look of absolute horror on his face, as if he had been frightened to death.

Ever since that night the friends have been plagued with horrible nightmares, and have taken to telling each other ghost stories. At one of their meetings, Sears tells them a ghost story about when he was a young man. Before deciding to attend law school James had taken a teaching position in a rural community. He developed a fascination with one of his students, a slow, mentally disturbed young boy named Fenny Bate. Fenny and his sister were ostracized by the community, and upon making some inquiries he finds out why. The two children once had an older brother named Gregory, and it was generally believed that Gregory sexually molested his younger brother. The mother of the siblings was dead, their father had abandoned the family, and Gregory was his younger siblings' guardian. One day while repairing a roof Gregory fell off the ladder and was killed, and someone thought they saw the two young Bate children running away from the scene. Sears tells his friends that in time he began to see a threatening young man hanging around the school, and he eventually came to believe it to be the spirit of Gregory Bate. Sears attempted to save Fenny from the clutches of his dead brother, but to no avail. Fenny died, and Sears left the small community when he had finished the school year.

The next morning after telling his story, Sears and Ricky are called out to the farm of one of their clients, who has found some mutilated livestock in his field. Meanwhile, a beautiful and mysterious young woman named Anna Mostyn has taken up residency at a hotel in the town and takes a job at Sears and Ricky's firm, claiming to be the niece of a former Milburn resident called Eva Galli, a name that stirs discomfort in the four men. Later in the car, Sears reveals to Ricky that the previous night's story was not fictitious, but had actually happened to him in his youth. Sears also admits that he is scared, as are all the members of the Chowder Society. They decide to write to Edward's nephew, Donald Wanderley, as Donald had written an occult novel and they think that his research abilities might be employed on their behalf. Before Donald arrives, however, Jaffrey dies in an apparent suicide by jumping off a bridge.

Donald arrives just as the funeral is coming to a close. The three remaining members of the Society tell him that they want him to investigate any possible avenues that he might deem appropriate. Several years previously Donald's brother David had died under mysterious circumstances, and it led him to write his horror novel. Donald tells them the sequence of true events that led him to write his novel in an effort to understand them. He had landed a teaching position at Berkeley on the strength of a good reception for his first novel and began seeing a beautiful graduate student named Alma Mobley. At first he was inseparable from her, and there was talk of marriage. But over time he began to notice strange things about her and felt that there was something unnatural about Alma. For example, she had a sinister drug-dealing acquaintance named Greg Benton (who was the guardian of a mentally disabled younger brother), even more sinister acquaintances who belonged to a cult associated with the Manson Family, and claimed to be in regular contact with the spirit of a dead man named Tasker Martin who "approved" their relationship. Donald stopped seeing her as much, his work suffered, and one day Alma simply vanished. Upon investigating he discovered that a great many things that Alma had told him about her past were fabrications; for example, she had claimed to be the daughter of a wealthy New Orleans artist named Robert Mobley, but upon researching Robert Mobley, Donald found he had two sons, but no daughter. A few months later his brother David called him and told him that he and Alma were engaged and that he wanted things to be right between Donald and his fiancee. Donald tried to warn David about Alma, but to no avail, and soon afterwards David was dead.

Not long after this Lewis Benedikt is murdered in the forest, and Sears and Ricky decide that it is time to tell Donald the most terrible story that the Chowder Society knows — and it, too, is a true tale. Fifty years previously a young woman named Eva Galli had moved to the town. She was in her early twenties and all five of the young men fell head over heels for her, although it was a purely platonic love. One night in 1929—not long after Black Tuesday—Eva came to see them, but she was not acting like herself. She made sexual advances and belittled them. There was a struggle, and Eva fell and hit her head. Believing her to be dead, they conspired to hide the body by putting it in a car and driving it into a deep pond. But at the last moment Eva's body disappeared from the inside of the car, and there was a lynx looking at them from the other bank.

Donald has already encountered Anna Mostyn, the young woman claiming to be the niece of Eva Galli, and found she immediately unnerved him, reminding him of Alma. Donald begins his research and quickly comes to the conclusion that what they are dealing with is a manitou, or some other kind of shape-shifting creature. He believes that Eva Galli, Alma Mobley, Anna Mostyn and also Ann-Veronica Moore, the mysterious young actress who was the guest of honor at the party at which his uncle died, are all the same creature, out for revenge on the Chowder Society for what they did to her as Eva Galli. Sears also recognizes Greg Benton and his idiot brother from Donald's description as Gregory Bate and his brother Fenny, from his strange experience during his time as a teacher. The men conclude that Greg and Fenny must belong to the same supernatural species as Eva. Donald finds some of his uncle's tape recordings and listens to parts not even his uncle had heard yet, where she speaks directly to him and the surviving Chowder Society, saying she belongs to an ancient race of beings and that she herself is old enough to remember the first humans in the country.

Donald, Ricky, and Sears are joined in their struggle by Peter Barnes, a young man whose mother was killed by Fenny and Gregory, who revealed to him they were previously normal human beings who were granted new life and powers. Gregory tells them that a woman named Florence de Peyser (whom Alma had previously told Donald was her aunt) helped resurrect them after their mortal deaths, and that Eva is also subservient to the de Peyser woman. Sears is ambushed and killed in his car, and the survivors now realize that the reanimated Gregory and Fenny are helping Eva in her endeavors. Gregory and Fenny attack Peter, Donald, and Ricky in a movie theater, but they are both killed in the ensuing struggle, leaving Donald to realize that though they have otherworldly powers, the creatures are not truly immortal. The survivors track Eva down and defeat her, but she escapes in a new shape.

Exhausted, Ricky leaves Milburn for an extended vacation with his wife, and Peter prepares for college. Donald keeps watch to see what form Eva will next appear in. Deducing that she will likely take on the form of a child, Donald watches the children in a local park, and upon encountering a mysterious girl called Angie who is shunned by the other children, becomes convinced she is Eva's newest incarnation. He invites Angie to come with him, and the narrative returns to the point at which it began, with Donald in the motel room in Panama with Angie.

While in Florida, Eva emerges from the form of the little girl and attempts to twist Donald's mind. He is able to resist, and kills her after she tries to take the form of a wasp to escape. Donald then prepares to go to San Francisco to hunt down Florence de Peyser.

Reception
Stephen King, in his non-fiction review of the horror medium, Danse Macabre, lists Ghost Story as one of the finest horror novels of the late 20th century and provides a lengthy review within its "Horror Fiction" section.

Relation to other Straub works
Ricky Hawthorne is mentioned in the author's 1983 novel Floating Dragon, in which it is stated that he is the uncle of a victim in the latter book. The town of Milburn briefly appears in Koko, published in 1988.

References

1979 American novels
American horror novels
American novels adapted into films
Coward-McCann books
Fiction about shapeshifting
Ghost novels
Novels by Peter Straub
Novels set in New York (state)